Coccothrinax guantanamensis is a palm which is endemic to eastern Cuba.

Henderson and colleagues (1995) considered C. guantanamensis to be a synonym of Coccothrinax hioramii.

References

guantanamensis
Trees of Cuba
Plants described in 1939